Habersham is an unincorporated community and coal town in Campbell County, Tennessee.  It is located along U.S. Route 25W in the Cumberland Mountains in the northeastern part of the county.  Known as "Cupp" in the early 1900s, the community was later renamed for a prominent railroad family.

References

Unincorporated communities in Campbell County, Tennessee
Unincorporated communities in Tennessee
Coal towns in Tennessee